Homer Alfred Neal (June 13, 1942 – May 23, 2018) was an American particle physicist and a distinguished professor at the University of Michigan. Neal was President of the American Physical Society in 2016.  He was also a board member of Ford Motor Company, a council member of the National Museum of African American History and Culture, and a director of the Richard Lounsbery Foundation.   Neal was the interim President of the University of Michigan in 1996.  Neal's research group works as part of the ATLAS experiment hosted at CERN in Geneva.

Biography 
Neal grew up an African-American in highly segregated Franklin, Kentucky, and was forced by his neighbors there to break off relations with a white friend with whom he had bonded over a shared interest in ham radio. He received his B.S. in Physics from Indiana University Bloomington in 1961, and earned his Ph.D. from the University of Michigan in 1966.  From 1976 to 1981, Neal was Dean for Research and Graduate Development at Indiana University, and from 1981 to 1986 he was provost at the State University of New York at Stony Brook.

Neal served as a Regent for the Smithsonian Institution from 1989 to 2001.  He served for 18 years on the board of directors of Ford Motor Company, from 1997 to 2014.  Neal also served as a Director for the Richard Lounsbery Foundation for 13 years.

Neal held Honorary Doctorates from Indiana University, Michigan State University, the University of Notre Dame.

On 14 Nov 2009, Dr. Neal described the discoveries of spin at the University of Michigan (UM) with a presentation: History of Spin at Michigan.

Professor Neal died on May 23, 2018, at the age of 75.

Science policy 

Homer Neal was a notable figure in U.S. science policy. From 1980 to 1986, Neal served as a member of the National Science Board of the National Science Foundation, the federal agency responsible for the funding of basic research. While on the National Science Board he chaired the committee that produced the Board's first comprehensive report on undergraduate science education. He has also served as Chairman of the Physics Advisory Committee of the National Science Foundation. Over the course of his career, Neal has delivered testimony on numerous occasions to Congress.

Neal also served as Regent of the Smithsonian Institution and on numerous advisory committees for science, research and policy organizations including Oak Ridge National Laboratory, Argonne National Laboratory, the Board of the Center for Strategic and International Studies, Lawrence Berkeley Laboratory, Fermilab, and others. He served as a member of the National Research Council Board on Physics and Astronomy and as a member of the American Physical Society (APS)'s Panel on Public Affairs. He was a recipient of the Society's Bouchet Award. He was an elected Fellow of the American Academy of Arts & Sciences

In 2013, Neal was elected to be the Vice-President of the American Physical Society, an association representing over 51,000 physicists in academia, national labs, and industry in the United States and worldwide. In 2015, he served as President-Elect and served as President of the APS in 2016. Homer Neal was a co-author of Beyond Sputnik: U.S. Science Policy in the 21st Century, a popular textbook and website on science policy. He served on the Advisory Board of the Journal of Science Policy & Governance.

In Apr 2014, colleagues and friends from around the world gathered at UM in Ann Arbor for a Homer Neal Symposium to honor Dr. Neal. The sessions focused on Neal's experiments at Brookhaven, Argonne, SLAC, Fermilab, and CERN, as well as his contributions to the US government as a member of the National Science Board, and to the Smithsonian Institution as a regent.

Bibliography 
 Beyond Sputnik: U.S. Science Policy in the 21st Century (2008),

References 

1942 births
2018 deaths
People associated with CERN
Presidents of the University of Michigan
University of Michigan faculty
Stony Brook University faculty
Indiana University Bloomington alumni
University of Michigan alumni
21st-century American physicists
20th-century American physicists
Sloan Research Fellows
Deaths from cerebrovascular disease
20th-century African-American scientists
21st-century African-American scientists
People from Franklin, Kentucky
African-American physicists
Presidents of the American Physical Society